Algarkirk and Sutterton railway station was a station which served the villages of Algarkirk and Sutterton in the English county of Lincolnshire. It was served by trains on the line from Boston to Spalding.

History

Opened by the Great Northern Railway it became part of the London and North Eastern Railway during the Grouping of 1923, passing on to the Eastern Region of British Railways during the nationalisation of 1948. It was then closed by the British Transport Commission.

The site today

The site today is new view windows and conservatories who are now trying to replenish areas to their original state. This is on the roundabout between the A16 and A17.

References 

  
  
 Station on navigable O.S. map

Former Great Northern Railway stations
Disused railway stations in Lincolnshire
Railway stations in Great Britain opened in 1848
Railway stations in Great Britain closed in 1961